The TeST TST-9 Junior is a Czech shoulder-wing, single-seat motor glider that was designed and produced by TeST of Brno. When it was available the aircraft was supplied as plans, in kit form for amateur construction or as a complete ready-to-fly aircraft. Production is now complete and the aircraft is no longer available.

Design and development
The TST-9 Junior was a development of the TST-7 Junior touring motor glider, incorporating a T-tail and other design refinements. The  span, shoulder-mounted wing is slightly forward-swept. The wing has less span than the TST-7 Junior and consequently the aircraft has a lower glide ratio. The landing gear is of tricycle configuration, making taxiing the aircraft much easier than the monowheel gear used on the TST-1 model. The aircraft was later further refined into the TST-13 Junior.

The price for a completed ready-to-fly aircraft in 2004 was €22,240.

Specifications (TST-9 Junior)

See also

References

External links
Photo of TeST TST-9 Junior

TST-9
2000s Czech sailplanes
Homebuilt aircraft
Motor gliders
Shoulder-wing aircraft